James Bruce, 8th Earl of Elgin and 12th Earl of Kincardine,  (20 July 181120 November 1863) was a British colonial administrator and diplomat. He served as Governor of Jamaica (1842–1846), Governor General of the Province of Canada (1847–1854), and Viceroy of India (1862–1863). In 1857, he was appointed High Commissioner and Plenipotentiary in China and the Far East to assist in the process of opening up China and Japan to Western trade. In 1860, during the Second Opium War in China, he ordered the destruction of the Old Summer Palace in Beijing, an architectural wonder with immeasurable collections of artworks and historic antiques, inflicting incalculable loss of cultural heritage. 
Subsequently, he compelled the Qing dynasty to sign the Convention of Peking, adding Kowloon Peninsula to the British crown colony of Hong Kong.

Early life and education

Lord Elgin was born in London on 20 July 1811, the son of the 7th Earl of Elgin and 11th Earl of Kincardine and his second wife, Elizabeth Oswald. He shared his birthday, 20 July, with his father.  He had six brothers and sisters, and three half-sisters and one half-brother from his father's first marriage. Lord Elgin's father was reportedly impoverished by his acquisition of the Elgin Marbles; it had cost him a large amount of money to transport them, and he sold them to the British government at a significant loss.

James Bruce was educated at Eton College and Christ Church, Oxford, graduating with a first in Classics in 1832. While at Oxford, he became friends with William Ewart Gladstone.

Career
He was elected at the 1841 general election as a Member of Parliament for Southampton, but the election was declared void on petition. He did not stand in the resulting by-election. In November 1841, on the death of his father, he succeeded as 8th Earl of Elgin.

Jamaica
James Bruce became Governor of Jamaica in 1842, During an administration of four years he succeeded in winning the respect of all. He improved the condition of the Afro-Caribbean workers, and conciliated the white planters by working through them.

Canada

In 1847 he was appointed Governor General of the Province of Canada by the Secretary of State for War and the Colonies, Henry Grey, 3rd Earl Grey, in the administration of Lord John Russell. Under Lord Elgin, the first real attempts began at establishing responsible government in Canada. Lord Elgin became the first Governor General to distance himself from the affairs of the legislature. Since then, the Governor-General has had a largely symbolic role with regards to the political affairs of the country. As Governor-General, he wrestled with the costs of receiving high levels of immigration in the Canadas, a major issue in the constant debate about immigration during the 19th century. 

In 1849 the Baldwin-Lafontaine government passed the Rebellion Losses Bill, compensating French Canadians for losses suffered during the Rebellions of 1837.  Lord Elgin granted royal assent to the bill despite heated Tory opposition and his own misgivings over how his action would be received in England. The decision sparked the Burning of the Parliament Buildings in Montreal by an English-speaking mob. Elgin was assaulted. Instead of calling in the military, he withdrew his family to their country residence and allowed civil authorities to restore order. Due to his relations with the United States, his support of the self-government and defence of the colony, and his settlement of the free-trade and fishery questions, he was raised to the peerage as Baron Elgin in 1849.

Also in 1849, the Stony Monday Riot took place in Bytown on Monday 17 September. Tories and Reformists clashed over the planned visit of Lord Elgin, one man was killed and many sustained injuries. Two days later, the two political factions, armed with cannon, muskets and pistols faced off on the Sappers Bridge. Although the conflict was defused in time by the military, a general support for the Crown's representative, triumphed in Bytown (renamed Ottawa by Queen Victoria in 1854). In 1854, Lord Elgin negotiated the Reciprocity Treaty with the United States in an attempt to stimulate the Canadian economy. Later that year, he granted royal assent to the law that abolished the seigneurial system in Quebec, and then resigned as Governor-General.

Elgin supported the Bagot Report, which was published in 1847 by Governor General Charles Bagot, and which is seen as the foundational document for the Canadian Indian residential school system. Elgin had been impressed by industrial schools he had seen while in the West Indies.

Soon after his return to England in 1854, Lord Palmerston offered him a seat in the cabinet as Chancellor of the Duchy of Lancaster, which he declined.

China and Japan

In 1857, Lord Elgin was appointed High Commissioner and Plenipotentiary in China and the Far East to assist in the process of opening up China and Japan to Western trade. During the Second Opium War, he led the bombardment of Canton (Guangzhou) and oversaw the end of the war by signing the Treaty of Tientsin (Tianjin) on 26 June 1858.

In 1859 Chinese troops continued to attack, and Lord Russell sent out Lord Elgin as ambassador extraordinary to demand an apology for the attack, the execution of the treaty, and an indemnity for the military and naval expenditure. In June 1860, Lord Elgin arrived in China to assist with additional attacks, which were initially led by his brother. On 18 October 1860, not having received the Chinese surrender and wishing to spare the imperial capital of Peking (Beijing), he ordered the complete destruction of the Old Summer Palace (Yuanming Yuan) outside the city in retaliation for the torture and execution of almost twenty European and Indian prisoners, including two British envoys and The Times journalist Thomas Bowlby. The Old Summer Palace was a complex of palaces and gardens eight kilometres northwest of the walls of Beijing; it had been built during the 18th and early 19th centuries, and was where the emperors of the Qing dynasty resided and handled government affairs. An alternative account says that Lord Elgin had initially considered the destruction of the Forbidden City. However, fearing that this act might interfere with the signing of the Convention of Peking, which was where it was being negotiated, he opted for the destruction of the Old Summer Palace instead.

The Old Summer Palace was set ablaze by 3,500 British troops and burned for three days. The Allied troops hurriedly looted the imperial collections in the palace, before the Old Summer Palace finished burning. Attacks on the nearby Summer Palace (Qingyi Yuan) were also made, but the extent of destruction was not as great as to the Old Summer Palace. On 24 October 1860, Lord Elgin signed the Convention of Peking, which stipulated that China was to cede part of Kowloon Peninsula and Hong Kong in perpetuity to Britain.

According to historian Olive Checkland, Lord Elgin "was ambivalent about the British imperial policy of forcing trade on the peoples in China and Japan. He deplored what he called the 'commercial ruffianism' which effectively determined British policy responses." In a letter to his wife, in regard to the bombing of Canton, he wrote, "I never felt so ashamed of myself in my life."

In between Lord Elgin's two trips to China, he had visited Japan. In August 1858, he signed the Treaty of Amity and Commerce, whose negotiation was much eased by the recent Harris Treaty between Japan and the United States. He would also present the Tokugawa administration the HMY Emperor, a modern and luxuriously appointed steam powered yacht as a present for the "Emperor" from Queen Victoria to commemorate the signing of the treaty.

India

Within a month of Elgin's return to England, Lord Palmerston selected him to be viceroy and governor-general of India. He became viceroy in 1862, the first viceroy directly appointed by the Crown, and as subject to the Secretary of State for India. Elgin tried to hold the Dutch in Sumatra in check, and marched a force to the Peshawar border to enforce earlier treaties.

He was the first to use Peterhoff, Shimla as the official residence of the Viceroy. In 1863, he was travelling from there to Sialkot, an arduous journey at a high elevation which exhausted him. He died in 1863 of a heart attack while crossing a swinging rope and wood bridge over the river Chadly, on the lap between Kullu and Lahul. He was buried in the churchyard of St. John in the Wilderness in Dharamshala.

Marriage and issue

Elgin married Elizabeth Mary Cumming-Bruce, the only child of MP Charles Lennox Cumming-Bruce, on 22 April 1841. The wedding was short lived, his wife dying shortly after the birth of a second daughter on 7 June 1843 in Jamaica. They had, along with another daughter:

Lady Elma Bruce (1842–1923), married in 1864 the 5th Baron Thurlow.

On 7 November 1846, Elgin married Lady Mary Louisa Lambton, daughter of the 1st Earl of Durham, a prominent author of the Report on the Affairs of British North America (1839) (as well as Governor General of the Canadas), and niece of the Colonial Secretary the 3rd Earl Grey (who was uncle to Albert Grey, 4th Earl Grey, later Governor General of Canada). They had four sons and a daughter:

Victor Bruce, 9th Earl of Elgin (1849–1917)
Hon. Robert Preston Bruce (1851–1893), MP for Fife and W. Fife
Hon. Frederick John Bruce (1854–1920), Page of Honour to Queen Victoria 1869–71, married in 1879 Katherine Bruce Fernie, and had four sons and four daughters.
Lady Louisa Elizabeth Bruce (1856–1902), unmarried

Controversy and English-based memorials
In Ontario, the towns of Kincardine, Port Elgin, and Bruce Mines, and Bruce County and Elgin County are named for the 8th Earl. The long Bruce Peninsula into Lake Huron, and the communities of Elgin, New Brunswick and Elgin, Nova Scotia are also named for him. There are numerous Elgin Roads and Elgin Streets in Canada and in India.

The Elgin Bridge in Singapore, and Elgin Street, Carlton, State of Victoria, and Elgin Street, Hong Kong are also named for Bruce, as is the Lord Elgin Hotel in Ottawa. 

Elgin's legacy in Canada was the subject of a National Film Board of Canada short docudrama, Lord Elgin: Voice of the People (1959), directed by Julian Biggs.

While China has opened up to French relations, the sale of Chinese art and artifacts in British auctions remains a point of tension between London and Beijing. All zodiac animal heads from the Summer Palace that have been found have returned to Chinese museums, however.

See also 
Anglo-Chinese relations
Anglo-Japanese relations

References

Sources

 Narrative of the Earl of Elgin's Mission to China and Japan, 1857-8-9 (2 volumes), Laurence Oliphant, 1859 (reprinted by Oxford University Press, 1970) {No ISBN}
 
 
 
"Moving Here, Staying Here:" The Canadian Immigrant Experience, Library and Archives Canada, A letter from Lord Elgin, Governor General of the Canadas, to the Colonial Office
 
 
  Also digitized by Canadian Institute for Historical Microreproductions, 2003.

External links

 
 
 
 
Biography at the Dictionary of Canadian Biography Online
Painting: James Bruce, Earl of Elgin, circa 1855. McCord Museum

Archives of James Bruce, 8th Earl of Elgin (James Bruce, Earl of Elgi and Kingardine, and family fonds, R977) are held ar Library and Archives Canada

1811 births
1863 deaths
People educated at Eton College
Alumni of Christ Church, Oxford
British expatriates in China
British expatriates in Japan
British people of the Second Opium War
8
12
Governors-General of the Province of Canada
Governors of Jamaica
Knights Grand Cross of the Order of the Bath
Knights of the Thistle
Lord-Lieutenants of Fife
Members of the Parliament of the United Kingdom for Southampton
Members of the Privy Council of the United Kingdom
Persons of National Historic Significance (Canada)
Rectors of the University of Glasgow
UK MPs 1841–1847
UK MPs who inherited peerages
UK MPs who were granted peerages
United Kingdom Postmasters General
Viceroys of India
Presidents of the Oxford Union
Peers of the United Kingdom created by Queen Victoria
Fellows of the Society of Antiquaries of Scotland